Peder Jensen (12 October 1897 – 13 November 1938) was a Danish equestrian. He competed at the 1928 Summer Olympics and the 1936 Summer Olympics.

References

External links
 

1897 births
1938 deaths
Danish male equestrians
Olympic equestrians of Denmark
Equestrians at the 1928 Summer Olympics
Equestrians at the 1936 Summer Olympics
People from Vordingborg Municipality
Sportspeople from Region Zealand